The British East India Company (EIC) had Whim built for use as a fast dispatch vessel. She was sold in 1802 and became a whaler that a French privateer captured and released, and then a merchant vessel. She is no longer listed after 1822.

Career
Whim was launched by Francis Barnard, Son & Roberts at Deptford on 23 January 1799, "under the particular inspection of the late Robert Charnock Esq. for his private use, copper fastened and coppered, the beams iron kneed." Captain John Ramsden received a letter of marque for Whim on 9 May 1799. He then sailed her to India.

On 15 November 1800 Captain Andrew Barclay received a letter of marque. On 23 November she sailed for Madras, leaving Spithead on 7 December. She arrived at Madras on 16 April 1801. She left Madras for Britain on 6 August and under the command of Captain John H. Fellers, and arrived at The Downs on 25 November. The EIC advertised the sale on 8 January 1802 of rice brought by its ships, including Whim.

In 1802 the EIC sold Whim to Captain T. Smith & Partners as the EIC no longer required her. Lloyd's Register for 1802 showed her master changing from "Tellfer" to J. Smith, and her trade becoming London-Cape of Good Hope.

Whim sailed on 24 October 1802. Lloyd's Register for 1803 now gave her trade as London-South Georgia, consistent with her leaving on a whaling voyage. In December, Whim stopped at Rio de Janeiro for water and provisions.

Five days later, Surcouf captured Unicorn off St Helena as Unicorn was returning from the South Seas. Surcouf plundered both vessels of their cargoes, transferred Unicorns crew to Whim, and then released Whim, against a ransom of 4000 piastres. Whims lost cargo consisted of 6000 seal skins and eight barrels of elephant seal oil. Whim sailed to St Helena where she was reported in May, and she returned to Britain on 15 July. 
	
By April 1805 Whim was lying moored off Horsleydown in the Pool of London and for sale by auction on 10 April at Lloyd's Coffee House in Cornhill. She failed to sell at auction and continued to be offered for sale until at least October that year.

Although Lloyd's Register carries Whim as whaling at South Georgia into 1806, there is no evidence of her making any other whaling voyages. Lloyd's Register for 1806 shows a change of master and ownership, but both are illegible. Whim, Forbes, master, was reported to have arrived at Dover in September 1806, having sailed with a fleet from Gibraltar on 24 August after having departed Algiers. She separated from the fleet on 12 September.

Lloyd's Register for 1807 shows the new master as Forbes, A. Dalziel as owner, and a trade of London-Algiers. In subsequent years masters change, with Dalziel being master in 1811. In 1812 ownership changes to Bold & Co., with J. Portis, master, and trade Liverpool-Africa.

Whim was reported to have been at "Princes" around the end of 1818. She had been plundered and lost a boat and four hands at Benin Bar.

Masters changed, but from 1819 on, Lloyd's Register shows Whim at Plymouth with Bold & Co. as owners, and S. Grillan as master. Whim is last listed in 1822.

Notes, citations, and references
Notes

Citations

References
 
 
 
 

1799 ships
Ships built in England
Ships of the British East India Company
Captured ships
Sealing ships
Age of Sail merchant ships
Merchant ships of the United Kingdom
Maritime incidents in 1804
Maritime incidents in 1818